Irina Nikolayevna Bykova (born 6 July 1993) is a Kazakhstani cross-country skier who competes internationally.

She competed for Kazakhstan at the FIS Nordic World Ski Championships 2017 in Lahti, Finland. She competed at the 2022 Winter Olympics, in   Women's 30 kilometre freestyle,  Women's sprint, and Women's 4 × 5 kilometre relay.

Cross-country skiing results
All results are sourced from the International Ski Federation (FIS).

Olympic Games

World Championships

World Cup

Season standings

References

External links 

1993 births
Living people
Kazakhstani female cross-country skiers
Tour de Ski skiers
Competitors at the 2017 Winter Universiade
Universiade medalists in cross-country skiing
Universiade silver medalists for Kazakhstan
Cross-country skiers at the 2022 Winter Olympics
Olympic cross-country skiers of Kazakhstan
People from Pavlodar
21st-century Kazakhstani women